Marcellus of Side (Marcellus Sidetes; 2nd century) a native of Side in Pamphylia, was a physician born towards the end of the 1st century AD, and lived during the reigns of Hadrian and Antoninus Pius, 117-161 AD. He wrote a long medical poem in Greek hexameter verse, consisting of forty-two books, which was held in such estimation, that it was ordered by the emperors to be placed in the public libraries at Rome. Of this work only two fragments remain, one Περὶ Λυκανθρώπου, De Lycanthropia, and the other Ἰατρικὰ περὶ Ἰχθύων, De Remediis ex Piscibus. Of these the former is preserved (but in prose) by Aëtius of Amida. The second fragment consists of about 100 verses.

According to the Greek Anthology, Marcellus was very famous and honored. His books were presented to the public library in Rome.

Notes

Bibliography
Πλουτάρχου περί τῆς τῶν ἐλευθέρων παιδῶν ἀγωγῆς. Accedunt bina ejusdem Plutarchi et Marcelli Sidetae medici fragmenta Graece, recensuit Joh. G. Schneider. Argentorati, Strassburg, 1775.

External links
Poetae bucolici et didactici. Theocritus, Bion, Moschus, Nicander, Oppianus, Marcellus de piscibus, poeta de herbis, C. Fr. Ameis, F. S. Lehrs (ed.), Parisiis, editore Ambrosio Firmin Didot, 1862, pp. 169-171.

2nd-century Roman physicians
Ancient Greek poets
2nd-century poets
2nd-century Greek physicians